The Panther Creek Railroad had its origins in 1849.  The Lehigh Coal & Navigation Company (LC&N) constructed it between Lansford, PA and the Philadelphia & Reading Railroad operating as the Little Schuylkill Railroad in Tamaqua, PA.  LC&N believed a direct route to take Panther Valley coal to eastern markets and a tunnel connecting Lansford to Hauto would open up possibilities with the Nesquehoning Valley Railroad.  It also allowed the LC&N to cease coal shipments to the Lehigh Canal on the Summit Hill & Mauch Chunk Railroad, operating since 1827.

Origins
In 1849, LC&N constructed the six-mile long Panther Creek Railroad from Lansford to Tamaqua.  This connected the rich Panther Valley coal mines in Coaldale and Lansford to the Philadelphia and Reading Railroad at Tamaqua and provided additional access to the Philadelphia market.  In 1871, developers saw the possibilities of a tunnel connecting Lansford to Hauto which would open up connections with the Nesquehoning Valley Railroad and the mines in Nesquehoning.  Eventually, an eastern branch was built from Lansford to Summit Hill, PA.

The tunnel was a joint venture by the Central Railroad of New Jersey (CNJ) and landlord LC&N shortly after the LC&N board of directors decided to opt-out of the rail transportation industry and leased the railroads it owned or controlled under the Lehigh and Susquehanna Railroad to the CNJ. The tunnel (called the Hauto Tunnel) would be advantageous for several reasons: 
to cut substantial mileage off of the trip to the Lehigh Canal terminal in Mauch Chunk, 
to shorten the distance to other anthracite coalfields in the Panther Creek Valley and others west of Tamaqua, 
to drain water from the higher elevation mines and 
to allow the CNJ to cease coal shipments to the Lehigh Canal via the Summit Hill & Mauch Chunk Railroad.
Eventually CNJ sold off the latter asset as a common carrier and tourist railway.

Work on the 1.1-mile, single-track Hauto Tunnel began in early 1871 and the two tunnel headings met on September 15.  The first train passed through on February 1, 1872.

Successor Railroads
The Panther Creek Railroad was operated as a branch line of the CNJ. In 1901 the Reading Railroad gained control of the CNJ.   The tunnel was last used in 1969 and abandoned.

The LC&N (then back in the rail transport business) gained control of the Lehigh and New England Railroad (L&NE) in 1904.  In 1912 a new L&NE extension opened, splitting from the main line at Danielsville, Pennsylvania and running west to Tamaqua to directly serve the LC&N. In October 1913, LC&N transferred its leasehold interest in the Tunnel to Panther Creek Railroad Company by deed which contained a provision that “in the event of abandonment, the right-of-way shall revert to Lehigh Coal.” On December 14, 1913, the L&NE acquired the balance of the Panther Creek Railroad, running east from Tamaqua to Summit Hill, and with a connection to the Hauto Tunnel for access to Nesquehoning obtained in 1915.  The L&NE made the route between Hauto and Maybrook, NY its main line.

L&NE decided to end its railroad operations in late 1961. The rapid decline of the anthracite coal business was seen on the horizon led to the decision to cease operations.  A few of its routes were spared when the nearby CNJ acquired, among others, its old line to Tamaqua (the old Panther Creek Railroad).  This ex-L&NE trackage was operated under a subsidiary known as the Lehigh & New England Railway (not Railroad).  The resulting Lehigh & New England Railway operated from 1961 until it was acquired in 1976 by ConRail.

It is now used by the Reading, Blue Mountain and Northern Railroad from Tamaqua to Lansford.

References

Defunct Pennsylvania railroads
Transportation in Carbon County, Pennsylvania